Oberbrechen station is a station on the Main-Lahn Railway, which runs from Frankfurt (Main) Hauptbahnhof to Limburg (Lahn), in the Brechen suburb of Niederbrechen in the German state of Hesse. With Niederbrechen station, it is one of two stations in Brechen. The station is in the network of the Rhein-Main-Verkehrsverbund (RMV) and is classified by Deutsche Bahn as a category 6 station and has two platform tracks.

History
A Haltepunkt (halt) was built in Oberbrechen with the construction of the Main-Lahn Railway in 1875. The entrance building was opened in 1879, which was built according to the same plan as the stations in Niederbrechen, Niederselters and Bad Camberg. The entrance building is a listed building. A second platform track was built in 1913.

Operations
Oberbrechen station has two platform tracks, each with an outside platform. Except for the Regional-Express trains on the RE 20 line, all trains on the Main-Lahn Railway stop here.

 Track 1 on the main platform (height: 34 cm, length: 227 m): RB 21/RB 22 to Limburg
 Track 2 on the island platform (height: 76 cm, length: 212 m): RB 21 to Niedernhausen/Wiesbaden and RB 22 to Frankfurt

Services

Rail
The following services currently call at Limburg:

Bus 

At Oberbrechen station there is a connection to the hourly LM-51 bus service towards Weilburg via Weyer, Münster and Weinbach. Route 285 goes to Limburg three times a day.

References

Railway stations in Hesse
Railway stations in Germany opened in 1875
Buildings and structures in Limburg-Weilburg